Gorantla is a village in Guntur district of the Indian state of Andhra Pradesh. It is located in Sattenapalle mandal of Guntur revenue division.

Demographics 

 Census of India, Gorantla had a population of 1,276 of which 648 are males while 628 are females. 182 children are in the age group of 0–6 years. Literacy rate of the village stands at 47.44 with 519 literates.

See also 
Villages in Guntur mandal

References

Villages in Guntur district